Xanthium (cocklebur) is a genus of flowering plants in the tribe Heliantheae within the family Asteraceae, native to the Americas and eastern Asia and some parts of south  Asia .

Description
The leaves are spirally arranged, with deeply toothed margins. Some species, notably Xanthium spinosum, are also very thorny with long, slender spines at the leaf bases.

The flower heads are of two types; One, in short terminal branches, produces only pollen. The other, in clusters in the axils of the leaves, produces seed.

It is covered with stiff, hooked spines, which stick to fur and clothing and can be quite difficult to detach. These burs are carried long distances from the parent plant during seed dispersal by help of animals (zoochorous).

Biology
Cockleburs are short-day plants, meaning they only initiate flowering when the days are getting shorter in the late summer and fall, typically from July to October in the Northern Hemisphere. They can also flower in the tropics where the daylength is constant.

Diversity
Over 200 names have been proposed for species, subspecies, and varieties within the genus. Most of these are regarded as synonyms of highly variable species. Some recognize as few as two or three species in the genus. The Global Compositae Checklist recognizes the following

Accepted species
 Xanthium albinum (Widd.) Scholz & Sukopp – Mongolia 
 Xanthium argenteum Widder – Chile
 Xanthium catharticum Kunth – Chile, Bolivia, Argentina
 Xanthium cavanillesii Shouw	– Argentina
 Xanthium inaequilaterum DC. – China, India, Southeast Asia
 Xanthium mongolicum Kitag. – Mongolia 
 Xanthium orientale L. – Europe, North Africa, Middle East
 Xanthium pungens Wallr. – Australia; naturalized in Eurasia
 Xanthium saccharosum
 Xanthium spinosum L. – spiny cocklebur, burreed, Bathurst burr – very widespread, nearly cosmopolitan
 Xanthium strumarium L. – clotbur, rough cocklebur, large cocklebur, common cocklebur – very widespread, nearly cosmopolitan

formerly included
see Ambrosia 
 Xanthium artemisioides – Ambrosia arborescens 
 Xanthium fruticosum – Ambrosia arborescens

Legal status
The cocklebur is legally listed as a noxious weed in the states of Arkansas and Iowa in the United States of America.

Toxicity and uses
The common cocklebur (Xanthium strumarium) is a native of North America. It has become an invasive species worldwide. It invades agricultural lands and can be poisonous to livestock, including horses, cattle, and sheep. Some domestic animals will avoid consuming the plant if other forage is present, but less discriminating animals, such as pigs, will consume the plants and then sicken and die. The seedlings and seeds are the most toxic parts of the plants. Symptoms usually occur within a few hours, producing unsteadiness and weakness, depression, nausea and vomiting, twisting of the neck muscles, rapid and weak pulse, difficulty breathing, and eventually death.

The plant also has been used for making yellow dye, hence the name of the genus (Greek xanthos = 'yellow'). The many species of this plant, which can be found in many areas, may actually be varieties of two or three species.  The seed oil is edible.

Xanthium strumarium is known as cang er zi (苍耳子) in traditional Chinese medicine. Xanthium is also used to treat nasal and sinus congestion.

The spines and seeds of this fruit are rich in a chemical called carboxyatractyloside (CAT), formerly referred to as xanthostrumarin, which is the chemical that is responsible for most of the adverse effects from the use of cang er zi. CAT has been shown to be a growth inhibitor in Xanthium and other plants, serving two functions, delaying seed germination and inhibiting the growth of other plants. Most of the chemical is concentrated in the spines. When the bur is prepared as an herbal remedy, the spines are usually removed, reducing the CAT content of the finished product.

In literature
In the O. Henry novel Cabbages and Kings cockleburrs (spelt thus) are used as a plot device in the chapters Shoes and Ships to persuade the normally barefooted inhabitants of a town in the fictitious banana republic of Anchuria to buy shoes.

Gallery

See also
 List of beneficial weeds
 List of companion plants
 List of plants poisonous to equines

References

Further reading
 

 
Asteraceae genera
Medicinal plants of Asia
Medicinal plants of North America
Taxa named by Carl Linnaeus